Thomas Loren Barrett (born April 2, 1960) is an American former second baseman in Major League Baseball who played for the Philadelphia Phillies (1988–1989) and Boston Red Sox (1992). Barrett was a switch-hitter and threw right-handed. In a three-season career, Barrett posted a .202 batting average with nine runs and four RBI in 54 games played.

After his playing career, Barrett managed two seasons in the Red Sox farm system.

Barrett's older brother, Marty Barrett, is a former second baseman who played with the Boston Red Sox and San Diego Padres, between 1982 and 1991.

References

External links

Tom Barrett at SABR (Baseball BioProject)
Tom Barrett at Baseball Almanac
Tom Barrett at Baseball Library

1960 births
Living people
Major League Baseball second basemen
Boston Red Sox players
Philadelphia Phillies players
Baseball players from California
Minor league baseball managers
Nashville Sounds players
Fort Lauderdale Yankees players
Reading Phillies players
Arizona Wildcats baseball players
Albany-Colonie Yankees players
Columbus Clippers players
Maine Phillies players
Paintsville Yankees players
Pawtucket Red Sox players
Scranton/Wilkes-Barre Red Barons players
Tucson Toros players
Mat-Su Miners players